Ranopisoa is a monotypic genus of flowering plants belonging to the family Scrophulariaceae. The only species is Ranopisoa rakotosonii.

Its native range is Madagascar.

References

Scrophulariaceae
Scrophulariaceae genera
Monotypic Lamiales genera